The following article presents a summary of the 2002 football (soccer) season in Paraguay.

First division results

Torneo Apertura
The Apertura tournament was played in a single all-play-all system. At the end, the top eight teams qualified to a playoff stage to determine the Apertura champion.

Apertura playoff stage
The top eight teams qualified to this stage.

Quarterfinals

|}

Semifinals

|}

Apertura final

|}

Libertad wins the Apertura tournament final by an aggregate score of 3-1 on May 11, 2002.

Torneo Clausura
The Clausura tournament was played in a two-round all-play-all system, with the champion being the team with the most points at the end of the two rounds.

Championship game playoff
The national championship game was played between the Apertura and Clausura tournaments winners.

Libertad declared as national champions by aggregate score of 6-2.

Relegation / Promotion
 Recoleta automatically relegated to the second division after finishing last in the average points table based over a three-year period.
San Lorenzo finished second-to-last in the aggregate points table, so had to participate in the promotion play-off game against second division runners-up Club Presidente Hayes. San Lorenzo won the playoff game by an aggregate score of 4-3, so it remains in the first division.
 Tacuary promoted to the first division by winning the second division tournament.

Qualification to international competitions
Libertad qualified to the 2003 Copa Libertadores by winning the Torneo Apertura.
12 de Octubre qualified to the 2003 Copa Libertadores by winning the Torneo Clausura.
Olimpia qualified to the 2003 Copa Libertadores as holders of the 2002 edition.
A four team playoff (based on best positions in the aggregate points table) was played to determine the 4th participant in the 2003 Copa Libertadores.

Pre-Libertadores playoff

Cerro Porteño qualifies to the 2003 Copa Libertadores by winning the Pre-Libertadores tournament.

Lower divisions results

Paraguayan teams in international competitions
Intercontinental Cup
Olimpia: runners-up
Copa Libertadores 2002:
Olimpia: Champions
Cerro Porteño: group-stage
12 de Octubre: group-stage
Copa Sudamericana 2002:
Libertad: preliminary second round
Cerro Porteño: preliminary first round

Paraguay national team
The following table lists all the games played by the Paraguay national football team in official competitions during 2002.

References
 Paraguay 2002 by Eli Schmerler, Andy Bolander and Juan Pablo Andrés at RSSSF
 Diario ABC Color

 
Seasons in Paraguayan football
Para